Great Britain competed at the 2000 Summer Paralympics in Sydney. Britain finished second in the medal table, in both number of gold medals won and total medals, behind host nation Australia.

Medallists
The following British competitors won medals at the Games. In the 'by discipline' sections below, medallists' names are in bold.

| width="95%" align="left" valign="top" |

| width="22%" align="left" valign="top" |

Medals by sport

Medals by gender

Multiple medallists

The following competitors won multiple medals at the 2000 Paralympic Games.

Events

Archery

Men

Women

Legend:

Athletics

Key

Men—Track

Men-field

Men-combined

Women—Track

Women-field

Boccia

Cycling

Road

Key
AT = actual time
FT = factor time

Track

Key
OVL = Win by overtaking
Q = Qualified for next round
WR = World record

Equestrian

Individual

Team

Goalball

Men's tournament

Women's tournament

Judo

WDL Withdrawal
S Shido
Bye = Athlete not required to compete in round
DNS = Did not start

Powerlifting

Sailing

Shooting

Swimming

Men

Women

Legend:

Table tennis

Men

Women

Wheelchair basketball

Men

Women

Wheelchair fencing

Men

Wheelchair rugby

Wheelchair tennis

See also
Great Britain at the 2000 Summer Olympics

References

Nations at the 2000 Summer Paralympics
Paralympics
2000